The Law of Five may refer to:
 Five elements (Chinese philosophy), "Law of Five Elements", in Taoism and various Asian philosophies
 Law of Fives, a principle from the religion Discordianism